Bill Benulis (November 5, 1928 – May 30, 2011) was an American comic book artist in the 1950s.  His style is distinctive, and he signed his work, he drew 146 stories in a variety of genres. He was associated with artist Jack Abel who inked much of his work. His work appears in war comics, horror comics, and science fiction comics, and was reprinted in the Marvel Comics reprint series, War Is Hell, as well as in several of the reprints of fifties comic books published under the IW imprint in the sixties. His work is also collected in several reprints in the Marvel Masterworks: Atlas Era series (Strange Tales, Battlefield and Journey into Mystery).

Biography

Benulis was born in 1928 in Brooklyn, New York. He married in 1959, and has three children and two grandchildren.

Between 1952 and 1956 he drew 146 comic stories, mostly for Atlas Comics, but also for Fiction House, Lev Gleason, American Comics Group, Superior, Prize and Premier Magazines. In 1952 he drew his only superhero stories, two Captain America tales in Captain America Comics #76. Although most of the comic stories that he drew did not credit the writer, he illustrated many written by Carl Wessler and several by Stan Lee, Frank Kelly, Hank Chapman and Burt Frohman. About a third of his stories were inked by Jack Abel.

He decided not to pursue his art further past the end of 1956 in order to provide for his family by working in the post office.  Despite living with the after-effects of childhood polio, he worked many years on foot as a letter carrier in the post office and retired from it around 1993. Sadly, he never drew any more after his short time in comics—a time in which he was able to work alongside others he admired like Will Eisner and Stan Lee.  He illustrated a cover for an early science fiction book by Scientology founder L. Ron Hubbard.

Bibliography
 Adventures Into Mystery 2, Atlas Comics
 Adventures Into Terror 11, 22–27, 31, Atlas Comics
 Adventures Into Weird Worlds 9, 12, 16, 24, 27, Atlas Comics 
 Amazing Detective Cases 4, Atlas Comics
 Astonishing 21, 29, 41, 45, 48, Atlas Comics
 Battle 20, 40, 41, Atlas Comics
 Battle Action 23, Atlas Comics
 Battlefield 10, Atlas Comics
 Battlefront 30, 34, 37, Atlas Comics
 Battleground 12, 14, Atlas Comics
 Black Magic (1950 series) Vol. 4, 4, Prize
 Captain America Comics 76, Atlas Comics
 Combat 10, 11, Atlas Comics
 Combat Casey 10–14, Atlas Comics
 Crime Does Not Pay (1942 series) 123, Lev Gleason
 Ghost Comics 4–11, Fiction House
 Girl Confessions 31, Atlas Comics
 Journey into Mystery 3, 10, 21, 24, 31, 33, 38, Atlas Comics 
 Journey into Unknown Worlds 33, 34, Atlas Comics
 Jumbo Comics 163, Fiction House
 Jungle Comics 163, Fiction House
 Justice Traps the Guilty Vol. 8, 2 Prize
 Marines in Action 8, Atlas Comics
 Marvel Tales 110, 111, 139, 141, Atlas Comics
 Marked Ranger 7, Fiction House
 Men's Adventures 19, Atlas Comics
 Monster 2, Fiction House
 Mystery Tales 2, 8, 15, 19, 28, 34, 35, 38, Atlas Comics
 Mystic 15, 30, 42, 45, 47, 481, Atlas Comics 
 Navy Action 1, 2, 3, 5, 8, Atlas Comics
 Outlaw Fighters 3, Atlas Comics
 Planet Comics 71, 72, 73, Fiction House
 Police Against Crime 2, 5, 6, Premier Magazines
 Rangers 67-69 Fiction House
 Romantic Adventures 40, American Comics Group
 Rugged Action 40, Atlas Comics
 Sinister Tales 56, Alan Class
 Spaceman 2, 6, Atlas Comics
 Spellbound 10, 11, 15, 23, 24, 26, Atlas Comics 
 Strange Suspense Stories 6, Atlas Comics
 Strange Tales 9, 10, 22, 30, 31, 36, 40, 50, Atlas Comics
 Strange Tales of the Unusual 3, 4, Atlas Comics
 Tales of Justice 54, Atlas Comics
 Uncanny Tales (comics) 11, 21, 22, 25, 26, 28, 30, 33, 38, 41, 42, 45, Atlas Comics
 War Comics 13, 21, 33, 37, 40, Atlas Comics 
 Western Outlaws 2, Atlas Comics
 Wild Western 32, Atlas Comics
 Wings Comics 124, Fiction House
 Young Brides Vol.2, 5, Prize
 Young Love Vol. 5, 11, Prize

Notes

References

External links
Bill Benulis on Comicvine
 Obituary.

1928 births
2011 deaths
American comics artists